Grenada  is a city in Grenada County, Mississippi, United States. The population was 13,092 at the 2010 census. It is the county seat of Grenada County.

History

Grenada was formed in 1836, after federal removal of the Choctaw people who had long occupied this territory.  It was the result of the union of the two adjacent towns (separated by the present-day Line Street) of Pittsburg and Tulahoma (or Tullahoma), founded, respectively, by Franklin Plummer and Hiram Runnels. 

Development included stores and businesses that supported the county court and market days.
Plantations were first developed along the Yalobusha River for transportation and access to water. Cotton was the major commodity crop, dependent on the labor of enslaved African Americans.

In 1851, Grenada townspeople founded the Yalobusha Baptist Female Institute for education of their young white women. In 1882, the school was taken over by the Methodists and renamed as Grenada College. Classified in the 20th century as a junior college, it encountered financial troubles during the Great Depression. The church closed the college in 1936 and transferred its assets to Millsaps College.

In December 1862, Confederate general Earl Van Dorn, whose troops had been encamped in Grenada, led the three brigades under his command in an attempt to destroy the Union supply depot at Holly Springs, Mississippi.

In 1885 two white men, Perry McChristian and Felix Williams, were accused of murdering two white peddlers and were lynched. During the lynching, they implicated two Black men, Bartley James and John Campbell, who were then also lynched by a mob of white men.

Civil rights era
In 1966, Martin Luther King Jr. and Dick Gregory, spent about a week demonstrating in Grenada against discrimination and for voters rights. During that time, town officials cooperated and protected marchers with local police. Six black voter registrars were hired, and registered 1,000 black residents during that week. After the march passed through, the county fired the registrars, and the town never entered the 1,000 new black voters on official rolls; they had to start over again to gain official voter registration.

As the civil rights movement continued to press in 1966 and 1967 for voter registration and opportunities in employment, the Southern Christian Leadership Conference (SCLC) ran a civil rights organizing project in Grenada which lasted at least 11 months. They worked to register voters and gain concessions for hiring African Americans in local businesses and restaurants. These were still segregated, despite the Federal anti-segregation and voting rights laws.

In August of 1966, a federal judge ordered Grenada to allow African-American students to enroll in the previously all-white schools. White leaders used threats of eviction and firing to coerce Black parents to withdraw from school. While the intimidation caused 200 out of 450 students to withdraw, the remaining 250 students attempted to enter school on September 12, 1966. A large mob of whites met them at the school and chased them away, pursuing them through the streets and beating the children with chains, pipes, and clubs. The mob went so far as to beat reporters as well. The mob repeated this for the first week of school, while local law enforcement did nothing. Federal protection for the children began on September 17, and 13 members of the mob were arrested.

Geography
The Yalobusha River flows through Grenada. Grenada Lake is located a short distance east of the city.

Demographics

2020 census

As of the 2020 United States census, there were 12,700 people, 5,100 households, and 2,988 families residing in the city.

2000 census
As of the census of 2000, there were 14,879 people, 5,701 households, and 3,870 families residing in the city. The population density was 496.8 people per square mile (191.8/km2). There were 6,210 housing units at an average density of 207.3 per square mile (80.1/km2). The racial makeup of the city was 49.28% White, 49.34% African American, 0.16% Native American, 0.50% Asian, 0.02% Pacific Islander, 0.12% from other races, and 0.56% from two or more races. Hispanic or Latino of any race were 0.70% of the population.

There were 5,701 households, out of which 33.4% had children under the age of 18 living with them, 41.9% were married couples living together, 22.2% had a female householder with no husband present, and 32.1% were non-families. 28.3% of all households were made up of individuals, and 12.1% had someone living alone who was 65 years of age or older. The average household size was 2.52 and the average family size was 3.10.

In the city, the population was spread out, with 27.5% under the age of 18, 9.4% from 18 to 24, 26.7% from 25 to 44, 20.5% from 45 to 64, and 15.9% who were 65 years of age or older. The median age was 35 years. For every 100 females, there were 82.5 males. For every 100 females age 18 and over, there were 76.5 males.

The median income for a household in the city was $25,589, and the median income for a family was $31,316. Males had a median income of $27,946 versus $21,913 for females. The per capita income for the city was $13,734. About 20.3% of families and 23.6% of the population were below the poverty line, including 30.1% of those under age 18 and 27.3% of those age 65 or over.

Education
Prior to 1966, a segregated system of schools was provided, with African-American children attending one set of schools and white children another. In 1966 the school system instituted a freedom of choice plan, which allowed black students to attend previously all-white schools. Mobs of white people congregated outside the schools to prevent African-American students from entering, and attacked young children when they left school in the afternoon. In 1966 white parents established the Grenada Educational Foundation, now known as Kirk Academy, as an alternative to racially-integrated education. Grenada, as well as Grenada County, is currently served by the Grenada School District.

Notable people
 Phillip Alford, child actor (To Kill a Mockingbird, Shenandoah), resident businessman
 Chris Avery, professional football player, born in Grenada
 Pete Boone, University of Mississippi athletic director, born in Grenada
 E.L. Boteler, Mississippi politician and businessman, born in Grenada
 Ace Cannon, musician
 Walter Davis, blues musician
 Jake Gibbs, baseball player, All American football player
 George Robert Hightower, educator
 Mississippi John Hurt, blues folk musician, died in Grenada
 M. D. Jennings, football player
 Trent Lott, U.S. senator, born in Grenada
 Jim Miles, baseball player
 Dave Parker, baseball player, 1978 MVP
 Ike Pearson, baseball player
Tyre Phillips, professional football player for the Baltimore Ravens
 Freeman Ransom, lawyer, businessman, and civic activist
 Greg Robinson, pro football player, born in Grenada
 Magic Sam, blues musician, born in Grenada
 Joseph D. Sayers, 22nd Governor of Texas
 Magic Slim, blues musician
 Homer Spragins, baseball player
 Trumaine Sykes, pro football player
 Donna Tartt, author
 Edward C. Walthall, United States senator
 Howard Waugh, Canadian football player and humanitarian
 Luke J. Weathers (December 16, 1920 – October 15, 2011), former U.S. Army Air Force officer and prolific Tuskegee Airmen
 Eddie Willis, member of Funk Brothers, born in Grenada
 William Winter, governor of Mississippi (1980-1984), born and grew up in Grenada
 Charlie Worsham, country singer, musician, and songwriter
 Frank Wright, jazz musician
 Genard Avery, professional football player

See also

 Billups Neon Crossing Signal, a unique railroad crossing signal erected in Grenada.

References

External links
City of Grenada official website

Cities in Mississippi
Cities in Grenada County, Mississippi
County seats in Mississippi
Micropolitan areas of Mississippi
Populated places established in 1836